Church of Realities is the sophomore extended play by American rock band Hed PE. Self-distributed in 1995, it was the band's first release.

Production
DJ Product©1969 drew the EP's cover.

Music
The music of Church of Realities establishes the band's trademark style, which primarily fuses elements of punk rock and hip hop. It also includes elements of funk, jazz and metal.

The EP's lyrical themes include "race, overcoming life's obstacles [and] government abuse", according to the OC Weekly.

Release
The album was independently produced by the band and distributed without a supporting label in 1995.

Legacy

Following the EP's release, the band changed its name, adding "PE", which stood for "Planet Earth", and signed with Jive Records, who released their self-titled LP in 1997. All tracks except "Inro" and "Hangman" from this EP were re-recorded for the LP, "1st Song" and "Spam" changed their names to "Firsty" and "Schpamb". Fred Durst of Limp Bizkit was inspired by this EP when recording Limp Bizkit's Three Dollar Bill, Y'all

Track listing

Personnel

həd
M.C.U.D. — lead vocals; lyrics
Wesstyle — lead guitar; music
Chizad (Chad Benekos) — rhythm guitar, backing vocals; music (3-5)
Mawk (Mark Young) — bass guitar; music (3, 5, & 8)
Kenny Tha Finga (Ken Sachs) —  keyboards
DJ Product ©1969 (Doug Boyce) — turntables, backing vocals; music (3-5)
B.C. (Ben C. Vaught) — drums/ percussion; music (3, 5, & 8)

References

1995 debut EPs
Hed PE EPs
Self-released EPs